This is a list of schools in the Metropolitan Borough of Wirral in the English county of Merseyside.

State-funded schools

Primary schools

Barnston Primary School, Heswall
Bedford Drive Primary School, Rock Ferry
Bidston Avenue Primary School, Claughton
Bidston Village CE Primary School, Bidston
Birkenhead Christ Church CE Primary School, Birkenhead
Birkenhead High School Academy, Oxton
Black Horse Hill school, West Kirby
Brackenwood Infant School, Bebington
Brackenwood Junior School, Bebington
Brookdale Primary School, Greasby
Brookhurst Primary School, Bromborough
Castleway Primary School, Moreton
Cathcart Street Primary School, Birkenhead
Christ The King RC Primary School, Bromborough
Church Drive Primary School, Port Sunlight
Co-op Academy Portland, Claughton
Co-op Academy Woodslee, Bromborough
Devonshire Park Primary School, Tranmere
Eastway Primary School, Moreton
Egremont Primary School, Wallasey
Fender Primary School, Woodchurch
Gayton Primary School, Gayton
Greasby Infant School, Greasby
Greasby Junior School, Greasby
Great Meols Primary School, Meols
Greenleas Primary School, Wallasey
Grove Street Primary School, New Ferry
Heswall Primary School, Heswall
Heswall St Peter's CE Primary School, Heswall
Heygarth Primary School, Eastham
Higher Bebington Junior School, Bebington
Hillside Primary School, Prenton
Holy Cross RC Primary School, Bidston
Holy Spirit RC/CE Primary School, Leasowe
Hoylake Holy Trinity CE Primary school, Hoylake
Irby Primary School, Irby
Kingsway Primary School, Wallasey
Ladymount RC Primary School, Pensby
Leasowe Primary School, Leasowe
Lingham Primary School, Moreton
Liscard Primary School, Wallasey
Manor Primary School, Birkenhead
Mendell Primary School, Bromborough
Mersey Park Primary School, Tranmere
Millfields CE Primary School, Eastham
Moreton Christ Church CE Primary School, Moreton
Mount Primary School, Wallasey
New Brighton Primary School, New Brighton
Our Lady and St Edward's RC Primary School, Birkenhead
Our Lady of Pity RC Primary School, Greasby
Overchurch Infant School, Upton
Overchurch Junior School, Upton
Oxton St Saviour's CE Primary School, Prenton
Park Primary School, Wallasey
Pensby Primary School, Pensby
Poulton Lancelyn Primary School, Bebington
Prenton Primary School, Prenton
The Priory Parish CE Primary School, Birkenhead
Raeburn Primary School, Bromborough
Riverside Primary School, Wallasey
Rock Ferry Primary School, Rock Ferry
Sacred Heart RC Primary School, Moreton
St Alban's RC Primary School, Liscard
St Andrew's CE Primary School, Bebington
St Anne's RC Primary School, Rock Ferry
St George's Primary School, Wallasey
St John's RC Infant School, Bebington
St John's RC Junior School, Bebington
St Joseph's RC Primary School, Oxton
St Joseph's RC Primary School, Upton
St Joseph's RC Primary School, Wallasey
St Michaels and All Angels RC Primary School, Woodchurch
St Paul's RC Primary School, Beechwood
St Peter's RC Primary School, Noctorum
St Werburgh's RC Primary School, Birkenhead
SS Peter and Paul RC Primary School, Wallasey
Sandbrook Primary School, Moreton
Somerville Primary school, Wallasey
Stanton Road Primary School, Bebington
Thingwall Primary School, Thingwall
Thornton Hough Primary School, Thornton Hough
Thurstaston Dawpool CE Primary School, Thurstaston
Town Lane Infant School, Bebington
Townfield Primary School, Prenton
Well Lane Primary School, Rock Ferry
West Kirby Primary School, West Kirby
West Kirby St Bridget's CE Primary School, West Kirby
Woodchurch CE Primary School, Woodchurch
Woodchurch Road Primary School, Oxted
Woodlands Primary School, Birkenhead

Non-selective secondary schools

Birkenhead High School Academy, Oxton
Birkenhead Park School, Birkenhead
Co-op Academy Bebington, Bebington
Hilbre High School, West Kirby
The Mosslands School, Wallasey
The Oldershaw Academy, Wallasey
Pensby High School, Pensby
Prenton High School for Girls, Birkenhead
Ridgeway High School, Noctorum
St John Plessington Catholic College, Bebington
St Mary's College, Wallasey
South Wirral High School, Eastham
Weatherhead High School, Wallasey
Woodchurch High School, Woodchurch

Grammar schools
Calday Grange Grammar School, West Kirby
St Anselm's College, Birkenhead
Upton Hall School FCJ, Upton
West Kirby Grammar School, West Kirby
Wirral Grammar School for Boys, Bebington
Wirral Grammar School for Girls, Bebington

Special and alternative schools

Clare Mount Specialist Sports College, Moreton
Elleray Park School, Wallasey
Foxfield School, Woodchurch
Gilbrook School, Woodchurch
Hayfield School, Upton
Kilgarth School, Birkenhead
Meadowside School, Woodchurch
The Observatory School, Bidston
Orrets Meadow School, Moreton
Stanley School, Pensby
Wirral Hospitals School, Claughton

Further education
Birkenhead Sixth Form College
Wirral Metropolitan College

Independent schools

Primary and preparatory schools
Avalon School, West Kirby
Prenton Preparatory School, Prenton

Senior and all-through schools
Birkenhead School, Oxton

Special and alternative schools
Life Wirral (Independent) Sport School, Wallasey
Progress Schools - Hamilton Square, Birkenhead
Progress Schools - Wirral, Birkenhead
West Kirby Residential School, West Kirby

Wirral
 List of schools in Wirral